Marilyn Loden (July 12, 1946 – August 6, 2022) was an American writer, management consultant, and diversity advocate. Loden is credited with inventing the phrase "glass ceiling", during a 1978 speech. Loden was a featured panelist on the BBC series 100 Women where she discussed the role of gender discrimination in the workplace. She was an alumna of Syracuse University. She authored three books that focused on employee diversity in the workforce.

Personal life and death
Loden was born on July 12, 1946, in New Hyde Park, New York.  She died following a year-long battle with lung cancer, on August 6, 2022, at the age of 76.

Bibliography
 Feminine Leadership, or, How to Succeed in Business Without Being One of the Boys. New York: Times Books, 1985.  
 and Judy B Rosener. Workforce America!: Managing Employee Diversity As a Vital Resource. Homewood, Ill.: Business One Irwin, 1991.  
 Implementing Diversity. Chicago: Irwin Professional, 1996.

References

1946 births
2022 deaths
American writers
Gender equality
Syracuse University alumni
BBC 100 Women
American women journalists
American women's rights activists
20th-century American women writers
21st-century American women writers
People from Hyde Park, New York
Deaths from cancer in California